Gösta Andersson may refer to:

 Gösta Andersson (wrestler) (1917–1975), Swedish wrestler
 Gösta Andersson (skier) (1918–1979), Swedish skier and winner of Vasaloppet
 Gösta Andersson (footballer), Swedish footballer